Rebel Richard Dean (born 11 April 1966) is a British actor, singer, songwriter, entertainer, and musician. He is known for his acting and singing roles in Joseph, Casualty, Only Fools and Horses, and Hollyoaks.

Biography 
Dean was given a guitar at the age of 10 and started playing at school's plays. By the age of fifteen he played the lead male in his first theatre role, Pharaoh in Joseph and the Amazing Technicolor Dreamcoat. After leaving school, he drove a Ford pick-up truck during the day and played the pubs and clubs at night. He has played many roles in theater, film and TV productions including Hollyoaks, Only Fools and Horses,  Casualty, This Life, The Vet (HTV), Prince and the Pauper, Inspector Wycliffe (HTV). Other films he has played the male lead in include Ebb Tide and California Eden.

Dean starred in the stage show 4 Steps to Heaven for the latter part of 1998 and most of 1999 playing the young, middle and mature Elvis Presley. He has co-written the anthem for the Cornish county rugby team Trelawney's Army.

Film

Commercial/ Documentary

Musical/ Voiceover/ Pantomime

Discography 
Dean has released a number of singles and albums so far in his music career.

Albums

Singles 

Other notable music contributions include That'll Be The Day portraying legends from Elvis Presley to Freddie Mercury.

References 

1966 births
British male musicians
British male actors
British male singers
Living people
Place of birth missing (living people)